Jens Olsson (born 9 December 1984) is a Swedish professional ice hockey defenceman who is currently playing for HC Košice of the Slovak Extraliga.

Playing career
On September 25, 2019, Olsson joined Genève-Servette HC on a one-year deal as a replacement for injured Henrik Tömmernes. He played 7 games (1 assist) following his arrival before being sent to the stands as a healthy scratch.

On October 28, 2019, Olsson was released by Genève-Servette after only a month.

Career statistics

Regular season and playoffs

References

External links

1984 births
Living people
Bofors IK players
Dragons de Rouen players
Frölunda HC players
Genève-Servette HC players
EHC München players
Malmö Redhawks players
Södertälje SK players
Swedish ice hockey defencemen
Sportspeople from Malmö
HC TPS players
HC Košice players
Swedish expatriate sportspeople in Slovakia
Swedish expatriate sportspeople in Switzerland
Swedish expatriate sportspeople in France
Expatriate ice hockey players in France
Expatriate ice hockey players in Switzerland
Expatriate ice hockey players in Slovakia
Swedish expatriate ice hockey players in Germany
Swedish expatriate ice hockey players in Finland